The FV104 Samaritan is the British Army armoured ambulance variant of the CVR(T) family. It has a capacity for up to 6 casualties.

The Samaritan is one of the variants of the Combat Vehicle Reconnaissance (Tracked) family of armoured fighting vehicles developed by Alvis plc for the British military.

See also
 Alvis plc
 Combat Vehicle Reconnaissance (Tracked)

References

Cold War armoured fighting vehicles of the United Kingdom
Military ambulances